Agromyces is a genus in the phylum Actinomycetota (Bacteria).

Etymology
The name Agromyces derives from:Greek noun agros, field or soil; New Latin masculine gender noun myces (from Greek masculine gender noun mukēs -etis), fungus; New Latin masculine gender noun Agromyces, soil fungus.

Species
The genus contains 31 species, namely
 A. albus ( Dorofeeva et al. 2003, ; Latin masculine gender adjective albus, white, referring to the white colour of colonies.)
 A. allii ( Jung et al. 2007, ;: New Latin genitive case noun allii, of Allium, referring to the source of isolation of the micro-organisms, the rhizosphere of Allium victorialis var. platyphyllum.)
 A. atrinae ( Park et al. 2010, ; New Latin noun Atrina, zoological name for a genus of bivalve mollusc; New Latin genitive case noun atrinae, of Atrina, referring to the isolation of the type strain from a fermented food prepared from Atrina pectinata (comb pen shell).)
 A. aurantiacus ( Li et al. 2003, ; New Latin masculine gender adjective aurantiacus, orange-coloured.)
 A. aureus ( Corretto et al. 2016 )
 A. bauzanensis ( Zhang et al. 2010, ; Medieval Latin masculine gender adjective bauzanensis, of or belonging to Bauzanum, the medieval Latin name of Bozen/Bolzano, a city in South Tyrol, Italy, from where the type strain was isolated.)
 A. binzhouensis (  Chen et al. 2016 )
 A. bracchium ( Takeuchi and Hatano 2001, ; Latin noun brachium (nominative in apposition), a branch of a tree, a twig, referring to the twig-like morphology.)
 A. cerinus ( Zgurskaya et al. 1992, ; Latin masculine gender adjective cerinus, waxcolored, yellow like wax.)
 A. flavus ( Chen et al. 2011 ) 
 A. fucosus ( Zgurskaya et al. 1992, ; New Latin noun fucosum, fucose; New Latin masculine gender adjective fucosus (sic), containing fucose in the cell wall.)
 A. hippuratus ( (Zgurskaya et al. 1992) Ortiz-Martinez et al. 2004, ; New Latin masculine gender adjective hippuratus, pertaining to hippurate, relating to the ability to decompose hippurate.)
 A. humatus ( Jurado et al. 2005, ; Latin masculine gender participle adjective humatus, buried.)
 A. indicus ( Dastager et al. 2012 )
 A. insulae ( Huang et al. 2016 )
 A. iriomotensis ( Hamada et al. 2014 )
 A. italicus ( Jurado et al. 2005, ; Latin masculine gender adjective italicus, of or pertaining to Italy, of Italy, the origin of the type strain.)
 A. lapidis ( Jurado et al. 2005, ; Latin noun lapis -idis, a stone; Latin genitive case noun lapidis, of a stone.)
 A. luteolus ( Takeuchi and Hatano 2001, ; Latin dim. masculine gender adjective luteolus, yellowish.)
 A. marinus ( Hamada et al. 2015 )
 A. mediolanus ( (ex Mamoli 1939) Suzuki et al. 1996, nom. rev., ; New Latin masculine gender adjective mediolanus (sic), of or belonging Mediolanum, the old name of Milan, Italy.)
 A. neolithicus ( Jurado et al. 2005, ; New Latin masculine gender adjective neolithicus, neolithic, referring to the origin of the neolithic paintings in Grotta dei Cervi, the source of the soil from which the organism was isolated.)
 A. ramosus ( Gledhill and Casida 1969, species. (Type species of the genus).; Latin masculine gender adjective ramosus, having many branches, much-branched.)
 A. rhizospherae ( Takeuchi and Hatano 2001, ; New Latin rhiza, root; Greek noun sphaira, sphere; New Latin genitive case noun rhizospherae, of the sphere of the root.)
 A. salentinus ( Jurado et al. 2005, ; New Latin masculine gender adjective salentinus, of or pertaining to Salentine Peninsula, the location of Grotta dei Cervi, the area from which the organism was isolated.)
 A. soli ( Lee et al. 2011 ) 
 A. subbeticus ( Jurado et al. 2005, ; New Latin masculine gender adjective subbeticus, of or belonging to the Subbetic Mountain Range, southern Spain, where the Cave of Bats is located.)
 A. subtropicus ( Hamada et al. 2014 )
 A. terreus ( Yoon et al. 2008, ; Latin masculine gender adjective terreus, of the earth.)
 A. tropicus ( Thawai et al. 2011, ; Latin masculine gender adjective tropicus, tropical, of or pertaining to the tropic(s), relating to isolation from a tropical forest.)
 A. ulmi ( Rivas et al. 2004, ; Latin genitive case noun ulmi, of the elm tree, referring to the isolation source of this micro-organism.)

See also
 Bacterial taxonomy
 Microbiology

References 

Microbacteriaceae
Bacteria genera